This article is about the demographic features of the population of Saint Mary's, including population density, internet access, crime rate, and other aspects of the population.

Population 
According to the 2011 census the population of Saint Mary was 7,341.

Other demographics statistics (2011)

Census Data (2011) 
Source:

Individual

Household 
There are 2,512 households in Saint Mary Parish.

See also
Demographics of Antigua and Barbuda

References

Antigua and Barbuda Christians
Demographics of Antigua and Barbuda